Kevin Borlée (born 22 February 1988) is a Belgian sprinter, who specializes in the 400 metres. He is a member of the Borlée family.

Borlée won bronze at the 2011 World Championships in the 400m. He qualified for the finals of the 400 metres at the 2012 Summer Olympics.  He was also a semi-finalist at both the 2008 Summer Olympics and the 2009 World Championships, and is the 2010 European Champion on this distance.

Borlée also competes with the Belgian 4 × 400 m relay team. The team won gold at the 2012, 2016 and 2018 European Championships, and the 2015 European Indoor Championships. The team finished 4th at the 2008 Summer Olympics, 4th at the 2009 World Championships, won silver at the 2010 World Indoor Championships and bronzes at the 2019 World Athletics Championships and the 2010 European Championships, 6th at the 2012 Summer Olympics and 4th at the 2016 Summer Olympics.

Biography

Early successes
He has an identical twin brother, Jonathan (b. 1988), younger brother, Dylan (b. 1992), and an older sister, Olivia (b. 1986), who are also sprinters. All four are trained by their father Jacques (b. 1957).

Just like his twin brother, Kevin Borlée obtained his first senior title at the age of 18: the Belgian Indoor championships in 2006 in Ghent, where he won the 400 m, while his brother won the 200 m. Later on, Borlée would add 3 more Belgian indoor titles: once more on the 400 m and two on the 200 m.

On 31 May 2008 Kevin and Jonathan took part in the 4 × 400 m on a meeting in Neerpelt. Together with Cédric Van Branteghem and Kristof Beyens, they improved a 27-year-old national record by more than a second to 3:02.51s. However, this was 1 hundred of a second above the qualification time for the Olympic Games. Two weeks later, with Nils Duerinck instead of Kristof Beyens, they broke the national record again in a meeting in Namur to 3:02.13s.

National records at Summer Olympics in Beijing
On 19 August 2008, during the semi-finals of the 2008 Summer Olympics, Kevin Borlée ran a new national record of 44.88s, improving the former record of Cédric Van Branteghem by 14 hundredths of a second. Despite he did not reach the final.

On the 4 × 400 m relay, with teammates Jonathan Borlée, Cédric Van Branteghem and Arnaud Ghislain, they qualified for the final with a new national record of 3:00.67s. They finished 5th in the final with yet again a national record of 2:59.37s. The race was won by the US team in 2:55.39s, a new Olympic record. The Russian team, who had finished 3rd, were later disqualified promoting Belgium to fourth place.

At the end of 2008, Borlée received the Belgian Golden Spike award.

Move to the United States
At the end of 2008, Kevin Borlée moved together with his brother Jonathan to Tallahassee to enroll in Florida State University. During this period, Borlée qualified for the NCAA-championships in Fayetteville, Arkansas. Borlée finished 4th on the 400 m in 45.43s in a race that was won by his brother Jonathan in 44.78s, a new national record. Later on they had a big part in 4 × 400 m relay victory of Florida State with time of 2:59.59s, the second best season time.

A couple of months later, at the 2009 World Championships, Borlée reached the semi-finals on the 400 m with 45.28s. On the 4 × 400 m relay with teammates Antoine Gillet, Nils Duerinck and Cédric Van Branteghem (Jonathan was out with a stress fracture), they finished 1st in their heat with 3:02.13s and finished 4th in the final in 3:01.88s.

Identical injury
Directly after the World Championships, it became clear that Kevin Borlée had sustained the same injury that ruled out his brother Jonathan 6 weeks earlier: a stress fracture on the tarsus. The story shows many similarities with the stress fracture of the tibia of the Swedish hurdles sprinters Susanna and Jenny Kallur. Both had the same injury at the different leg.

Silver at World Indoor Championships
At the beginning of 2010, the Borlée-twins were back in shape. At the 2010 World Indoor Championships, the 4 × 400 m relay team with teammates Nils Duerinck and Antoine Gillet, they won their heat in 3:09.84s, a national indoor record. In the final, with Cédric Van Branteghem instead of Nils Duerinck, they won silver with a time 3:06.94s, another national record. It was the first time a Belgian relay team had ever delivered such a performance.

European Championships 2010

At the 400 m of the European Championships in Barcelona, Kevin Borlée reached the final with two wins in the heats and the semi-finals in 45.71s and 45.32s respectively. In the final, Borlée seemed to fall back after a good start, but with an impressive sprint in the last 50 m, he passed the pack to win in front of Britain's Michael Bingham and Martyn Rooney in 45.08s, a season's best. With this win, he is only the third Belgian male athlete to become a European Champion. The last one was Karel Lismont on the marathon in 1971, the first one Gaston Roelants in 1962 on the steeple chase. His brother Jonathan finished 7th in 45.35s.

The Belgian 4 × 400 m relay team, which besides Kevin Borlée included Antoine Gillet, Cédric Van Branteghem and Nils Duerinck, reached the final. With 3:03.49s, they had the fastest time. In the final Antoine Gillet and Nils Duerinck were replaced by Arnaud Destatte and Jonathan Borlée. The Belgian team won bronze in 3:02.60s.

2012
The Belgian team won the 4 × 400 m at the European Championships.

At the Olympics, Borlée reached the final of the 400 m, finishing 5th.

2015
The Belgian 4 x 400 team that Borlée was in set a new area record in winning the gold medal of the European Indoor Championship. The team also finished 5th at the World Championship.

2016
Borlée qualified for both the 400 m and the 4 × 400 m at the 2016 Olympics, reaching the semi-finals in the individual events. The 4 × 400 m team finished in 4th place, setting a new national record. The 4 × 400 m team had previously won the European Championships.

European Championships 2018
At the 400 m of the European Championships in Berlin, Kevin Borlée reached the final with a win in heat 1 in 45.29s and a 3rd place finish in the 3rd semi-final in 45.07s (fastest losing time) . In the final, Borlée had his trade mark slow start, but with an impressive sprint in the last 100 m, he passed the pack to come in second after Britain's Matthew Hudson-Smith in 45.13s. Jonathan finished 3rd in 45.19s.

The Belgian 4 × 400 m relay team, which included Julien Watrin, Robin Vanderbemden, 2018 junior world champion Jonathan Sacoor and younger brother Dylan, reached the final with a win in heat 2 in 3:02.44s, the 4th fastest qualifying time. In the final Julien Watrin and Robin Vanderbemden were replaced by the twin brothers Kevin and Jonathan. The Belgian team won gold in 2:59.47s.

Borlée family

The progenitor of the Borlee family is Jacques, bronze medalist at the 1983 European Indoor Championships in Budapest on 200 m, while his first wife Edith Demaertelaere was a good sprinter with a personal best of 23.89. Six of his seven children are athletes (the first five born from the first marriage with Edith, the last two born from a second marriage).

The eldest daughter Olivia won the gold medal at the Olympics and the world bronze at the 2007 Osaka World Championships with the 4 × 100 m relay and the other daughter Alizia was also a decent sprinter. The four sons are all 400 m specialists, the twins Jonathan and Kevin, both Olympic finalists in London 2012, Dylan and the youngest Rayane. In addition, Jacques' older brother Jean-Pierre was also a sprinter.

Achievements

Major tournaments

1Did not start in the semifinal

Personal bests

See also
 Borlée family
 Belgian men's 4 × 400 metres relay team

References

External links

1988 births
Living people
People from Woluwe-Saint-Lambert
Belgian male sprinters
Athletes (track and field) at the 2008 Summer Olympics
Olympic athletes of Belgium
Belgian twins
Twin sportspeople
Athletes (track and field) at the 2012 Summer Olympics
Athletes (track and field) at the 2016 Summer Olympics
World Athletics Championships medalists
European Championships (multi-sport event) gold medalists
European Athletics Championships winners
Walloon sportspeople
World Athletics Championships athletes for Belgium
Diamond League winners
World Athletics Indoor Championships medalists
European Athletics Indoor Championships winners
Athletes (track and field) at the 2020 Summer Olympics
Florida State Seminoles men's track and field athletes
Sportspeople from Brussels